The Kontsevich system is a Cyrillization system for the Korean language and currently the main system of transcribing and transliterating Korean words into the Cyrillic alphabet.

Features 

Cyrillization systems for Korean were developed domestically in both North Korea (where it has been proposed to replace the current script in the past) and South Korea; Kontsevich carried out work on the systemization of these rules. In contrast with some systems of Romanization of Korean, the transcription is based primarily on the pronunciation of a word, rather than on its spelling.

Consonants

Initial

Final

Medial consonant rules
Some letters are transcribed differently in the middle of a word when following certain other letters.

Vowels

Examples

Notes 
Korean personal names are written by family name first, followed by a space and then the given name. As a rule, syllables in given names are not separated.

See also
 Romaja
 New Korean Orthography
 Hangul

External links 
  Degrees of Courtesy and Communication Styles in the Korean Language, by K. B. Kurotchenko.
  Entry for Lev Kontsevich on the Institute of Oriental Studies.
  Russian and Latin Transcription of Korean Words, by Lev Kontsevich.

Korean language
Korean
Korea–Soviet Union relations